Mauritz Rosenberg (1879–1941) was a Finnish politician who served as vice president and finance minister of the Terijoki government during the Finnish Democratic Republic.

Biography
Rosenberg was born in Turku in 1879. He worked as a locomotive driver and newspaper editor. Rosenberg was a member of the Finnish Communist Party. In the period between 1 December 1939 and 12 March 1940 he served as vice president and finance minister in the cabinet, known as Terijoki government, led by Otto Wille Kuusinen. Rosenberg died in 1941.

References

External links

20th-century Finnish journalists
1879 births
1941 deaths
Communist Party of Finland politicians
People of the Finnish Civil War (Red side)
Politicians from Turku
 Ministers of Finance of Finland